Chakán Putum was the name of a Mayan chiefdom of the southwestern Yucatán Peninsula, before the arrival of the Spanish conquistadors in the sixteenth century.
It was named after the capital city Chakan Putum. The city had approximately 8000 houses. It was a major port.

Organization
After the war between the Tutul Xiu and Cocom, the Yucatán Peninsula, broke up into approximately 16 kuchkabalob. In the present day state of Campeche there was Ah Canul, Can Pech and Chakán Putum. Conflicts between Kuchkabal were common, especially between Tutul Xiu and Cocom.

Normally each Kuchkabal had a capital where the ruler and supreme priest lived. The ruler was called a Halach Uinik. Each Kuckabal was divided into several municipalities called "Batalib" which in turn were governed by officials called "Batab" who were usually relatives of the Halach Uinik. Each Batab, was the military leader of its population.

On the religious side, after Halach Uinik, was the Ah Kin May, and the regular priests Ah Kin (meaning coming from the Sun). Also there was a sacrificial priest called "Ah Nacom".

Geographic Description 
The population of Chakán Putum was found by the shores of the Champotón River, and the territory was named after this people. To the West of Chakán Putum was the Gulf of Mexico, to the Southwest was Tabasco (the territory of the Chontales Mayans), to the North was the Can Pech territory, and to the East of the territory (although there was no definite border) were the cities of Ulumal, Haltunchén and Sihocha. The inhabitants of Chakán Putum and Chactemal were both in the Putún ethnic group, which resulted in frequent migration of settlers between their territories. The Mexicans made no distinction between the territories of Can Pach and Chakán Putum, and renamed the both of them as the province of “Chochistán”. Only 70 kilometers to the Southwest of Chakán Putum was the Chontales Mayan city, Tixchel. Chakán Putum was an important point in the commercial route from the Tabasco cities Cupilco, Potonchán, and Xicalango to the rest of the peninsula and Caribbean Sea.

Economy 
The narratives of the Spanish Conquistadors described a city of 8000 houses. They also told of a fishing fleet of more than 2000 canoes which went out to sea each day and arrived at the reef temple to supplicate and thank their gods. The Champotón River was navigable, and was used by the Mayan merchants to gain admission to the interior parts of the territory. After the Spanish conquest of Yucatán, the natives were obligated to pay a tribute of fish. Other mentionable settlements from the time period of the conquest of Chakán Putum were Si Ho Beach, Haltunchen, Sihochac, Kehte, and Teop.

European contact
 

In 1517, 18, and 19 the Spaniards battled the Maya of Chakan Putum. Chakan Putum had 2,000 war canoes.
After the Spaniards allied with neighboring Can Pech and conquered Tabasco they invaded a fourth time between 1527 and 1528.

On March 25, 2021, accompanied by Bolivian President Luis Alberto Arce Catacora, President Andrés Manuel López Obrador (AMLO) paid homage to 504 years of indigenous resistance to colonialism by the inhabitants of Chakán Putum.

Notes

References

</ref>

Mayan chiefdoms of the Yucatán Peninsula